G Adventures is an operator of small-group escorted tours. It is based in Toronto, Ontario, Canada with 28 offices worldwide. It offers more than 700 itineraries in more than 100 countries, and carries 200,000 travelers from 160 countries each year.

The company has a focus on responsible travel and partners with the National Geographic Society, creating a program of 80 tours called National Geographic Journeys with G Adventures.

History
The company was cofounded as Gap Adventures in 1990 (and later named G Adventures) by Anita Voth and Bruce Poon Tip who met while working at the Toronto office of Australian tour operator, Worldwide Adventures. The letters in the name Gap Adventures stood for "Great Adventure People" and "bridging the gap" between backpacking and other types of travel, respectively.

In February 1991, the company operated its first tour - an excursion to Ecuador with 6 participants.

In 2008, the company was sued by Gap Inc. for use of the "Gap" name. In 2011, the company was required to change its name by the United States District Court for the Southern District of New York, which  deemed the name was an infringement on the clothing brand and caused legitimate confusion and dilution. The company then changed its name to G Adventures.

In January 2017, the company acquired British travel brands Travelsphere and Just You, based in Market Harborough.

In June 2019, the company opened a headquarters in Boston.

In March 2020, the company started a severe retrenchment process due to the recent outbreak of the Coronavirus disease with many of its employees being impacted.

Awards
In 2018, the company was recognized as one of the World's Most Innovative Companies by Fast Company and was honoured at the Edison Awards for Social Impact.

Partnerships
In 2011, G Adventures partnered with Global Exploration for Educators Organization (GEEO) with the goal of helping more teachers explore the world and then bring their experiences back into their classrooms. Since then, over 2,000 teachers have traveled through the GEEO/G Adventures program.

In 2013, G Adventures entered into a $1.3 million partnership with the Multilateral Investment Fund, a member of the Inter-American Development Bank, the largest source of development funding for Latin America and the Caribbean.

In 2015, G Adventures announced a partnership with the National Geographic Society, creating a program of 80 tours called National Geographic Journeys with G Adventures.

In 2016 on World Tourism Day, G Adventures announced a partnership with the Jane Goodall Institute. The Jane Goodall Collection by G Adventures is a program of 20 itineraries aimed at raising the awareness of animal welfare and wildlife-friendly tourism, endorsed by primatologist Dr. Jane Goodall.

References

External links
 
 Planeterra - a non-profit foundation funded by the company

Adventure travel
Companies based in Toronto
Travel and holiday companies of Canada
Canadian travel websites